Charles James Wright (born April 5, 1964) is a former American football defensive back who played two seasons in the National Football League (NFL) with the Arizona Cardinals, Dallas Cowboys and Tampa Bay Buccaneers. He was drafted by the Cardinals in the tenth round of the 1987 NFL Draft. He first enrolled at Highland Community College before transferring to Fort Scott Community College and lastly the University of Tulsa. Wright attended Carthage Senior High School in Carthage, Missouri. He was also a member of the Ottawa Rough Riders, Edmonton Eskimos, Memphis Pharaohs and San Jose SaberCats. He was stabbed. He is the brother of gridiron football player Felix Wright.

References

External links
Just Sports Stats

Living people
1964 births
Players of American football from Missouri
American football defensive backs
Canadian football defensive backs
African-American players of American football
African-American players of Canadian football
Tulsa Golden Hurricane football players
St. Louis Cardinals (football) players
Dallas Cowboys players
Tampa Bay Buccaneers players
Ottawa Rough Riders players
Edmonton Elks players
Memphis Pharaohs players
San Jose SaberCats players
People from Carthage, Missouri
Fort Scott Greyhounds football players
21st-century African-American people
20th-century African-American sportspeople